Praseodymium orthoscandate is a chemical compound, a rare-earth oxide with a perovskite structure. It has the chemical formula of PrScO3.

Preparation 
Praseodymium orthoscandate can be obtained by reacting praseodymium(III,IV) oxide with scandium oxide.

Properties 
Praseodymium orthoscandate is a green solid. It has an orthorhombic perovskite-type crystal structure with space group Pnma (space group No. 62).

In 2021, with the help of electron ptychography, researchers were able to achieve the highest magnification. In this way, the researchers managed to enlarge the atoms of a praseodymium orthoscandate crystal by a factor of 100 million.

See also 
 Praseodymium
 Scandium
 Oxygen

References 

Praseodymium compounds
Scandium compounds
Oxides